The canton of Tarn et Causses is an administrative division of the Aveyron department, southern France. It was created at the French canton reorganisation which came into effect in March 2015. Its seat is in Sévérac-d'Aveyron.

It consists of the following communes:
 
Campagnac
La Capelle-Bonance
Castelnau-Pégayrols
La Cresse
Montjaux
Mostuéjouls
Peyreleau
Rivière-sur-Tarn
La Roque-Sainte-Marguerite
Saint-André-de-Vézines
Saint-Beauzély
Saint-Laurent-d'Olt
Saint-Martin-de-Lenne
Saint-Saturnin-de-Lenne
Sévérac-d'Aveyron
Verrières
Veyreau
Viala-du-Tarn

References

Cantons of Aveyron